Vappuvanna was a Shilahara ruler of north Konkan branch, or modern-day western India, from 880 CE – 910 CE.

Kapardin II was followed by his son Vappuvanna, about whom his successors' records give only conventional praise.(Dept. Gazetteer: 2002)

See also
 Shilahara

References
 Bhandarkar R.G. (1957): Early History of Deccan, Sushil Gupta (I) Pvt Ltd, Calcutta.
 Fleet J.F. (1896): "The Dynasties of the Kanarese District of The Bombay Presidency", written for The Bombay Gazetteer.
 Department of Gazetteer, Govt of Maharashtra (2002): Itihaas : Prachin Kal, Khand -1 (Marathi)
 Department of Gazetteer, Govt of Maharashtra (1960): Kolhapur District Gazetteer
 Department of Gazetteer, Govt of Maharashtra (1964): Kolaba District Gazetteer
 Department of Gazetteer, Govt of Maharashtra (1982): Thane District Gazetteer
 A.S. Altekar (1936): The Silaharas of Western India.

External links
 Silver Coin of Shilaharas of Southern Maharashtra (Coinex 2006 - Souvenir)

Shilahara dynasty
9th-century rulers in Asia
10th-century rulers in Asia